Love's Gonna Get Ya! is the eighth studio album by American country music artist Ricky Skaggs. It was released in 1986 via Epic Records. The album peaked at number 3 on the Billboard Top Country Albums chart.

Track listing
"Love's Gonna Get You Someday" (Carl Chambers) – 3:32
"I'm Beside Myself" (Carl Jackson, Ethan Reilly) – 2:52
"I Wonder If I Care as Much" (Don Everly) – 3:11
"Don't Stop Gypsy" (Larry Cordle) – 2:57
"Hard Row to Hoe" (Jim Rushing) – 3:24
"I Won't Let You Down" (Gary Burr) – 3:58
"Walking in Jerusalem" (Traditional) – 4:42
"Artificial Heart" (Johanna Hall, John Hall) – 3:47
"Love Can't Ever Get Better Than This" (Irene Kelley, Nancy Montgomery) – 3:44
"Daddy Was a Hard Working Honest Man" (Wayland Patton) - 3:11
"Raisin' the Dickens" (Buddy Emmons) – 3:02
"New Star Shining" (Johanna Hall, John Hall) – 3:30

Personnel 
 Ricky Skaggs – lead vocals, harmony vocals (1-4, 6, 8), acoustic guitar (1, 3-6, 8, 9, 12), electric guitar (1, 5, 7), lead guitar (2), acoustic rhythm guitar (2, 11), mandolin (5, 7, 9), fiddle (5, 9), electric rhythm guitar (8), triangle (9), acoustic lead guitar (10), electric lead guitar (10), mandocaster (11)
 Gary Smith – acoustic piano (1, 2, 6, 7, 8, 11, 12), Kurzweil synthesizer (4, 9), Yamaha DX7 (4, 9)
 Dennis Burnside – acoustic piano (3, 4, 5, 9, 10)
 Dave Innis – keyboards (6, 12)
 John Hall – electric lead guitar (8), backing vocals (8)
 Terry Crisp – steel guitar (1, 2, 6, 8, 11)
 Lloyd Green – steel guitar (3, 4, 10)
 Jesse Chambers – bass (1, 2, 7, 8, 9, 11)
 Emory Gordy Jr. – bass (3, 4, 10)
 Joe Osborn – bass (5)
 Leland Sklar – bass (6, 12)
 Martin Parker – drums (1, 2, 7, 8, 11), percussion (7)
 Kenny Malone – drums (3, 4, 10), percussion (3, 4, 10)
 Eddie Bayers – drums (5, 6, 9, 12)
 Bobby Hicks – fiddle (1, 11)
 Wayland Patton – harmony vocals (1, 7)
 Kathy Chiavola – harmony vocals (4)
 Louis Pyrtle – harmony vocals (7)
 Bobby Jones and New Life – choir (7)
 Larry Hoppen – backing vocals (8)
 Sharon White-Skaggs – backing vocals (9)
 James Taylor – backing vocals (12)

Production 
 Ricky Skaggs – producer 
 Marshall Morgan – engineer (1, 7, 8)
 Ed Seay – engineer (2-6, 9-12), mixing 
 Tom Harding – assistant engineer, mix assistant 
 Tom Der – assistant engineer (2-6, 9-12), mix assistant 
 George Massenberg – vocal overdub recording 
 Sharon Rice – vocal overdub recording assistant 
 George Marino – mastering at Sterling Sound (New York, NY)
 Virginia Team – art direction, design 
 Beverly Parker – photography

Chart performance

References

1986 albums
Ricky Skaggs albums
Albums produced by Ricky Skaggs
Epic Records albums